South Arkansas Community College (SouthArk) is a public community college in El Dorado, Arkansas.

South Arkansas Community College, known locally as SouthArk, is a public, comprehensive community college with an open-door policy, providing educational programs, workforce development, civic and cultural enrichment, and support services to students and residents in its service area.

Formed from a merger of the El Dorado branch of Southern Arkansas University and Oil Belt Technical College, South Arkansas Community College was approved by a 62 percent majority vote in Union County in March 1992. Then Governor Bill Clinton appointed a nine-member Board of Trustees, and all assets and liabilities of Oil Belt and SAU-El Dorado were transferred by June 30, 1992, to SouthArk. The former Oil Belt campus became known as the East Campus and the former SAU-El Dorado the West Campus.

In addition to the two campuses in El Dorado, the college also offers instruction at a location in Warren, as well as and EMT and Paramedic courses at Metropolitan Emergency Medical Services in Little Rock.

Athletics

In the 2019–2020 academic year, the college began intercollegiate athletics, starting men's and women's basketball programs. The team mascot is the Stars.

See also 
 El Dorado Junior College Building
 W. F. & Estelle McWilliams House
 South Arkansas Arboretum

References

External links
Official website

Educational institutions established in 1992
Buildings and structures in El Dorado, Arkansas
Education in Union County, Arkansas
Community colleges in Arkansas
Universities and colleges formed by merger in the United States
1992 establishments in Arkansas